Mildred Hall may refer to:
 Mildred Hall (sociologist), maiden name of sociologist Mildred Blaxter
 Mildred Hall (teacher), first public school teacher at the Log School House in the Yellowknife, Northwest Territories, Canada